KNWA (1600 AM) is a radio station licensed to serve Bellefonte, Arkansas, United States. The station, established in 1986, is owned by Harrison Radio Stations, Inc.

Programming
KNWA broadcasts a classic country music format.

History
This station received its original construction permit for a new 500 watt AM station broadcasting at 1600 kHz from the Federal Communications Commission on July 23, 1985.  The new station was assigned the call letters KNWA by the FCC on August 29, 1985.

KNWA received its license to cover from the FCC on August 11, 1986.

References

External links

NWA
Classic country radio stations in the United States
Radio stations established in 1986
Boone County, Arkansas
1986 establishments in Arkansas